In solid mechanics, the linear stability analysis of an elastic solution is studied using  the method of incremental deformations superposed on finite deformations. The method of incremental deformation can be used to solve static, quasi-static  and time-dependent problems. The governing equations of the motion are ones of the classical mechanics, such as the conservation of mass and the balance of linear and angular momentum, which provide the equilibrium configuration of the material. The main corresponding mathematical framework is described in the main Raymond Ogden's book Non-linear elastic deformations and in Biot's book Mechanics of incremental deformations, which is a collection of his main papers.

Nonlinear Elasticity

Kinematics and Mechanics

Let  be a three-dimensional Euclidean space. Let  be two regions occupied by the material in two different instants of time. The deformation gradient is given by

For a quasi-static problem, without body forces, the equilibrium equation is

where  is the divergence with respect to the material coordinates.

If the material is incompressible, i.e. the volume of every subdomains does not change during the deformation, a Lagrangian multiplier is typically introduced to enforce the internal isochoric constraint . So that, the expression of the Piola stress tensor becomes

Boundary conditions

Basic solution
The defined problem is called the boundary value problem (BVP). Hence, let  be a solution of the BVP. Since  depends nonlinearly on the deformation gradient, this solution is generally not unique, and it depends on geometrical and material parameters of the problem. So, one has to employ the method of incremental deformation in order to highlight the existence of an adjacent solution for a critical value of a dimensionless parameter, called control parameter  which "controls" the onset of the instability. This means that by increasing the value of this parameter, at a certain point new solutions appear. Hence, the selected basic solution is not anymore the stable one but it becomes unstable. In a physical way, at a certain time the stored energy, such as the integral of the density  over all the domain of the basic solution is bigger than the one of the new solutions. To restore the equilibrium, the configuration of the material moves to another configuration which has lower energy.

Method of incremental deformations superposed on finite deformations

To improve this method, one has to superpose a small displacement  on the finite deformation basic solution . So that:

,

where  is the perturbed position and  maps the basic position vector  in the perturbed configuration .

Deformation gradient

The perturbed deformation gradient is given by:

,

where , where  is the gradient operator with respect to the current configuration.

Stresses

The perturbed Piola stress is given by:

where  denotes the contraction between two tensors, a forth-order tensor  and a second-order tensor . Since  depends on  through , its expression can be rewritten by emphasizing this dependence, such as

If the material is incompressible, one gets

It is useful to derive the push-forward of the perturbed Piola stress be defined as

where  is also known as the tensor of instantaneous moduli, whose components are:

.

Incremental governing equations
Expanding the equilibrium equation around the basic solution, one gets

Since  is the solution to the equation at the zero-order, the incremental equation can be rewritten as

where  is the divergence operator with respect to the actual configuration.

The incremental incompressibility constraint reads

Expanding this equation around the basic solution, as before, one gets

Incremental boundary conditions
Hence, the perturbed boundary condition are

Solution of the incremental problem
The incremental equations

represent the incremental boundary value problem (BVP) and define a system of partial differential equations  (PDEs). The unknowns of the problem depend on the considered case. For the first one, such as the compressible case, there are three unknowns, such as the components of the incremental deformations , linked to the perturbed deformation by this relation .  For the latter case, instead, one has to take into account also the increment  of the Lagrange multiplier , introduced to impose the isochoric constraint.

The main difficulty to solve this problem is to transform the problem in a more suitable form for implementing an efficient and robusted numerical solution procedure. The one used in this area is the Stroh formalism. It was originally developed by Stroh  for a steady state elastic problem and allows the set of four PDEs with the associated boundary conditions to be transformed into a set of ODEs of first order with initial conditions. The number of equations depends on the dimension of the space in which the problem is set. To do this, one has to apply variable separation and assume periodicity in a given direction depending on the considered situation. In particular cases, the system can be rewritten in a compact form by using the Stroh formalism. Indeed, the shape of the system looks like

where  is the vector which contains all the unknowns of the problem,  is the only variable on which the rewritten problem depends and the matrix  is so-called Stroh matrix and it has the following form

where each block is a matrix and its dimension depends on the dimension of the problem.

Conclusion and remark

The Stroh formalism provides an optimal form to solve a great variety of elastic problems. Optimal means that one can construct an efficient numerical procedure to solve the incremental problem. By solving the incremental boundary value problem, one finds the relations among the material and geometrical parameters of the problem and the perturbation modes by which the wave propagates in the material, i.e. what denotes the instability.

By this analysis, in a graph perturbation mode vs control parameter, the minimum value of the perturbation mode represents the first mode at which one can see the onset of the instability. For instance, in the picture, the first value of the mode  in which the instability emerges is around  since the trivial solution  and  does not have to be considered.

See also
Deformation (mechanics)
Elastic instability
Continuum mechanics

References 

Elasticity (physics)